Solbergfoss is a small village in Askim municipality, Norway. Located a few miles north of the town Askim on the east bank of the Glomma river, Solbergfoss has a power plant which was built in 1924. In 1918 a railway line, Askim–Solbergfosslinjen, from Askim to Solbergfoss was built.

References
Solbergfoss Spydeberg-Askim 

Villages in Østfold
Askim
Populated places on the Glomma River